Tom Weilandt (born 27 April 1992) is a German professional footballer who plays as a midfielder for Regionalliga Nordost club Greifswalder FC.

Club career
Weilandt started playing football with local Rostock clubs SV Warnemünde and LSG Elmenhorst. In 2003, he joined the youth ranks of Hansa Rostock where he also became German under 19 champion in 2010. In the following year he eventually made it to the club's first team squad, making his debut in a 3. Liga match versus SV Wehen Wiesbaden on 30 April 2011.

International career
In 2009, Weilandt earned two caps for the Germany under 18 team.

Personal life
Weilandt is the son of former East Germany international Hilmar Weilandt. His nickname "Hille" is also derived from his father's first name.

Career statistics

References

External links

1992 births
Sportspeople from Rostock
Living people
German footballers
Germany youth international footballers
Association football midfielders
2. Bundesliga players
3. Liga players
Regionalliga players
Oberliga (football) players
FC Hansa Rostock players
SpVgg Greuther Fürth players
VfL Bochum players
Holstein Kiel players
Footballers from Mecklenburg-Western Pomerania